ʿAbd al-Raḥīm ibn ʿUmar ibn Abī Bakr Jamāl al-Dīn al-Dimashqī, commonly known as al-Jawbarī (fl. 619/1222), was a medieval Syrian Arab author and scholar known for his denunciation of alchemy.  Born in Jawbar, Syria, Al-Jawbari traveled extensively throughout the Islamic Empire, including visits as far as India. Among other locations, the scholar lived in Harrân and Kôniya.

Al-Jawbari wrote the "Book of Selected Disclosure of Secrets" (Kitāb al-mukhtār fī kashf al-asrār), exposing the fraudulence he had seen practiced by alchemists and money changers. He wrote of "the people of al-Kimya (alchemists) who know three hundred ways of making dupes". The book also describes the preparation of rose water.

References

Alchemists of the medieval Islamic world
Deception
Alchemy and chemistry in the medieval Islamic world
13th-century deaths
Syrian Muslim scholars of Islam
Year of birth unknown
Syrian writers
13th-century Arabs